Frieda Friedman (born 1905, date of death unknown) was a writer of children's literature who, from the mid-1940s to the late 1960s, published several short, illustrated novels primarily intended for preteen and adolescent girls. Her works enjoyed republication and numerous printings through the 1970s, and in some cases until the late 1980s.

Biography
Friedman was born in Syracuse in 1905. After earning a B.S. from New York University, Friedman entered into graduate study at Columbia University and New York University. In the course of her professional career, she was employed by New York American and several other newspapers and magazines. In 1930 she began writing poetry for the Norcross Greeting Card Company, and was eventually promoted to editor.

Friedman lived in New York City, and set some of her fiction there. She wrote often about girls in supportive, working-class or middle-class families. Illustrators of Friedman's work include Valeria Patterson, Carolyn Haywood, Mary Barton, Mary Stevens, Jacqueline Tomes, Vivienne Blake, Ulrike Zehe-Weinberg, Erich Hölle, Leonard Shortall, and (the pseudonymous) Emmo. On three occasions, the New York Herald Tribune Spring Book Festival recognized her work in adolescent fiction with an Honor Choice award: in 1947 for Dot for Short; in 1949 for A Sundae with Judy; and in 1956 for The Janitor's Girl.

Franz Schneider Verlag of Munich published German localisations of some of her titles. Auf Dotty ist Verlaß (1959) is based on Dot for Short (1947), and has new illustrations by Ulrike Zehe-Weinberg; Ellen hat die besten Freunde (1965), illustrated by Erich Hölle, derives from Ellen and the Gang (1963). Scholastic Book Services republished Dot for Short, Carol from the Country, and The Janitor's Girl with new illustrations by Mary Stevens; Carol from the Country is retitled Carol.

Bibliography

References

Further reading

 

1905 births
Year of death missing
American children's writers
American literary editors
American women poets
Greeting cards
American women editors
American women children's writers